The 2020–21 Belmont Bruins men's basketball team represented Belmont University in the 2020–21 NCAA Division I men's basketball season. The Bruins, led by second-year head coach Casey Alexander, played their home games at the Curb Event Center in Nashville, Tennessee as members of the Ohio Valley Conference. In a season limited due to the ongoing COVID-19 pandemic, the Bruins finished the season 26–4, 18–2 in OVC play to win the regular season championship. They defeated SIU–Edwardsville and Jacksonville State before losing to Morehead State in the OVC tournament championship game. Because of a limited National Invitation Tournament due to COVID-19, the Bruins did not receive an automatic bid to the NIT for being regular season champions. They did not receive an at-large bid to the NIT either.

Previous season
The Bruins finished the 2019–20 season 26–7, 15–3 in OVC play to finish in a tie for the regular season championship. They defeated Eastern Kentucky and Murray State to win the championship of the OVC tournament. As a result, they received the conference's automatic bid to the NCAA tournament. However, the NCAA Tournament was canceled due to the COVID-19 pandemic.

Roster

Schedule and results

|-
!colspan=12 style=| Regular season

|-
|-
!colspan=12 style=| Ohio Valley Conference tournament
|-

|-

Source

References

Belmont Bruins men's basketball seasons
Belmont Bruins
Belmont Bruins men's basketball
Belmont Bruins men's basketball